Slavko Avsenik (November 26, 1929 – July 2, 2015) was a Slovene composer and musician. Beginning in 1953 with the formation of the Avsenik Brothers Ensemble, Avsenik produced more than 1,000 songs and garnered success both in Slovenia and in other parts of Europe and America, and is viewed as a Slovenian cultural icon.

Biography
Over forty years, the Avsenik Ensemble's original "Oberkrainer" sound became the primary vehicle of ethnic musical expression for Slovenia, Austria (Germany) Switzerland, northern Italy and the Benelux countries, spawning hundreds of Alpine orchestras in the process.

The ensemble, known as "Ansambel bratov Avsenik" or "Slavko Avsenik und seine Original Oberkrainer" has performed before millions, including heads of state, on radio and television, and in thousands of concerts. Selling about 12 million records, Avsenik has earned thirty-one gold, two diamond, and one platinum record. The "Johann Strauss of the twentieth century," Avsenik collaborated with his brother, Vilko, to produce nearly 1000 original compositions and an integral part of the Cleveland-style legacy. The Avsenik saga began in 1953 with a band formed in Slovenia, broadcast on the Slovene Hour from Austria, and dubbed the "Musicians of the Oberkrain" by a Vienna disc jockey. Growing in popularity, they soon began appearing in broadcasts, movies, and concerts in West Germany.

Landing a recording contract with Telefunken-Decca in 1960, the Ensemble rose to meteoric heights throughout Europe. It appeared regularly on network television, toured relentlessly (logging over 400,000  miles in 1967 alone), and recorded prolifically. Milestones include a 1961 performance before over 80,000 in Berlin Stadium, tours of the US and Canada in 1970 and 1985, and a one-hour German television network special in 1980.

As Slovenia's most popular music band, the group has won countless awards including eight consecutive television competitions, twelve from German network television, eighteen as Germany's most popular band, the recording industry's "European Oscar" in 1975, the Golden Rose Award (most requested on Austrian radio) in 1979, the Linhart plaque (Slovenia), and the "Hermann Löns" award from the German Minister of Culture.

Avsenik's influence over Cleveland-Style music began in 1958 when Johnny Pecon's English lyrics transformed Slavko's "Tam kjer murke cveto" into a Greatest All-Time Cleveland-Style Hit, "Little Fella". Since then, Cleveland-Style orchestras have recorded well over 200 Avsenik songs including nearly sixty by the Hank Haller Ensemble and as many more by Fred Ziwich, Fred Kuhar, the Fairport Ensemble, Al Markic, Roger Bright, Al Tercek, and Cilka Dolgan. Avsenik tribute bands in North America include Duke Marsic and his Happy Slovenians (Cleveland, 1964 to 1990), the Alpine Sextet (Cleveland, 1976 to 1996 and 2010 to present), Ansambel Veseli Godci / Veseli Farani (Cleveland, 1996 to present), Marjan Kramer, Zadnja Kaplja (Chicago, 2011 to present), Planinski Kvintet (Toronto Canada ) and Iskre (Canada). Many Slovenian polka/oberkrainer style bands in Europe are also in tribute of Avsenik's music, including Slovenia's Hišni ansambel Avsenik and Gašperji/Die Jungen Oberkrainer. In sheer volume, Avsenik's compositions rank him with Slovenian folk music, Matt Hoyer, and Dr. William J. "Doc" Lausche as the major tributaries feeding the Cleveland-Style repertoire. But the breathtaking beauty pervading his waltzes... "Pastirček/Hirtenlied", "Slovenia/Slovenija, odkod lepote tvoje", "Veter nosi pesem mojo/The wind song", "Čakala bom" ("I shall wait"), "European Waltz", "Na svidenje" ("So long"), "On the Bridge", and "Argentina", to name just a golden few... best characterize the profound nature of his impact.

The most popular song of Avsenik's band is the polka titled "Na Golici" in Slovene, or "Trompeten-Echo" in German, "Trumpet Echoes" in English, which is considered the most played instrumental song in the world, being an early trademark and success of the Avsenik Brothers. Avsenik died on July 2, 2015, at the age of 85.

Albums

Goldene Klänge Aus Oberkrain (Telefunken, 1971)
Goldene Klänge Aus Oberkrain II (Telefunken, 1973)
Jägerlatein in Oberkrain (Telefunken, 1974)
Jägerlatein in Oberkrain (London International, 1974)
Es Ist So Schön Ein Musikant Zu Sein (2xLP, Telefunken, 1974)
16 Welterfolge (Telefunken, 1975)
Mit Musik Und Guter Laune (2xLP, Telefunken, 1975)
Sonntagskonzert (Telefunken, 1975)
Lustig Und Fidel (Telefunken, 1978)
He! Slavko! Spiel Uns Eins! (Telefunken, 1978)
Ein Feuerwerk Der Musik (Koch Records, 1986)
Wir Bleiben Gute Freunde (Koch Records, 1990)
Es Ist So Schön Ein Musikant Zu Sein (Virgin, 1990)
Polkafest in Oberkrain (CD, Koch Records, 1997)
Am Schönsten Ist's Zu Haus 
Mit Musik Und Guter Laune 
Auf Silbernen Spuren (Royal Sound)
Stelldichein in Oberkrain (Telefunken)
Daheim in Oberkrain (Telefunken)
Die 20 Besten (cass)
Ein Abend Mit Slavko Avsenik Und Seinen Original Oberkrainern (Telefunken)
Mit Polka Und Waltzer Durch Die Welt (Telefunken)
Im Schönen Oberkrain (Telefunken, Deutscher Schallplattenclub)
Die Oberkrainer Spielen Auf (10", Telefunken)

References

Further reading
 Ivan Sivec (2015). Slavko Avsenik und seine Original Oberkrainer. ICO.

External links 

 
 The Avsenik brothers' website
 Avsenik videos

1929 births
2015 deaths
Slovenian composers
Slovenian accordionists
Polka musicians
Schlager musicians
20th-century composers
21st-century composers
Male composers
People from the Municipality of Radovljica
20th-century male musicians
21st-century male musicians